Adam's Rib is a 1923 American silent drama film directed by Cecil B. DeMille. A print of the film exists in the George Eastman House film archive.

Plot summary

Cast
 Milton Sills as Michael Ramsay
 Elliott Dexter as Prof. Nathan Reade
 Theodore Kosloff as Monsieur Joromir, King of Moravia
 Anna Q. Nilsson as Mrs. Michael Ramsay
 Pauline Garon as Mathilda Ramsay
 Julia Faye as The Mischievous One
 Clarence Geldart as James Kilkenna
 Robert Brower as Hugo Kermaier
 Forrest Robinson as Kramer
 Gino Corrado as Lt. Braschek
 Wedgwood Nowell as Minister's Secretary
 Clarence Burton as Cave Man
 George Field as Minister to Moravia
 William Boyd (uncredited)

References

External links

 
 
 
 
 Adam's Rib at VirtualHistory

1923 films
1923 drama films
Silent American drama films
American silent feature films
American black-and-white films
Films directed by Cecil B. DeMille
1920s American films